Alkalitalea is a Gram-positive and obligately anaerobic genus of bacteria from the family of Marinilabiliaceae with one known species (Alkalitalea saponilacus).Alkalitalea saponilacus has been isolated from the Soap Lake in the United States.

References

Bacteria genera
Bacteroidia
Monotypic bacteria genera